The George and Annie Bell House was built in 1862–1863 in Lawrence, Kansas by Douglas County Clerk George Bell. The one-and-a-half-story stone structure was constructed from locally mined limestone. In October 1862, George Bell paid sixty dollars for an empty lot and had the house constructed. On August 21, 1863, he and his family were residing in the unfinished house during Quantrill's raid. George Bell attempted to defend Lawrence from the attack, but was shot and killed. The raiders then attempted to burn down the house, but the Bell family was able to save it. The home was occupied on and off for several years by his widow, Annie, and her children, who frequently lived in the cellar and rented out the upstairs rooms to boarders. The house was sold in 1914 by the heirs of George and Annie Bell to the Allisons, who kept it for 48 years. The home was refurbished in the early 1980s and was placed on the National Register of Historic Places on August 11, 1983. It is currently a private residence.

References

External links
 

Houses on the National Register of Historic Places in Kansas
Houses completed in 1863
Houses in Douglas County, Kansas
Historic American Buildings Survey in Kansas
Buildings and structures in Lawrence, Kansas
National Register of Historic Places in Douglas County, Kansas